Jim Denney (born July 5, 1983) is an American ski jumper who competed in the 2006 Winter Olympics.  Denny represented the United States team at the age of 22. He is from Minnesota. His father, Jimm Denney, is also a former Olympic ski jumper.

References

1983 births
Living people
American male ski jumpers
Olympic ski jumpers of the United States
Ski jumpers at the 2006 Winter Olympics
Place of birth missing (living people)